The 1915 Maidstone by-election was held on 22 February 1915.  The by-election was held due to the incumbent Conservative MP, Charles Vane-Tempest-Stewart's, succession as seventh Marquess of Londonderry.  It was won by the Conservative candidate Carlyon Bellairs who was unopposed due to a War-time electoral pact.

References

1915 in England
Borough of Maidstone
1915 elections in the United Kingdom
By-elections to the Parliament of the United Kingdom in Kent constituencies
Unopposed by-elections to the Parliament of the United Kingdom (need citation)
1910s in Kent